Edirnekapı is a quarter of Istanbul, Turkey. It is part of the district of Fatih and belongs to the walled city.

It corresponds roughly to the central part of the sixth Hill of Istanbul, which is the highest point of the walled city.  It lies south of the Blachernae section of the Walls and of the neighborhood of Ayvansaray, northwest of Karagümrük and west of Salmatomruk. The quarter corresponds to the Byzantine quarter of Deuteron. The name Edirnekapı ("Gate of Edirne") hearkens back to Edirne's Gate (the ancient Gate of Charisius), crossed by the old road, which led to Edirne, the ancient Adrianople in Thracia. The district had a significant percentage of Orthodox Christian population, which left it for more central areas after 1955.

The quarter is crossed by Fevzi Paşa Caddesi, one of the most important roads of the historic part of Istanbul.

Places of interest
Edirnekapı has several historical sites, like the Museum of Chora, the historic Hagia Yorgi Greek Orthodox Church, a UNESCO world heritage site and the imperial Mosque of Mihrimah Sultan. Outside the gate lies the Edirnekapı Martyr's Cemetery, one of the oldest cemeteries of Istanbul. The famous legist Ibrahim al-Halabi is buried here.

Hagia Yorgi Church

The Hagia Yorgi Church in Edirnekapı was demolished with the order of Byzantine Emperor Constantine V and rebuilt. The structure survived until the conquest of Istanbul by the Ottomans. During the construction of the Mihrimah Sultan Mosque in the Ottoman era in 1556, the Hagia Yorgi Church, which was on the land of the mosque, was demolished and moved to its current place.

In the 17th century, the church was also known as Hagia Yorgi Platea d’Oignon. It was restored in 1726 and in 1730. Sometime later, the structure collapsed and was rebuilt in 1836 by the architect Nikolaos. The structure underwent a complete restoration afterward. A small restoration was done later in 1991 under the inspection of Ecumenical Patriarch Bartholomew I of Constantinople. In 2014, a three-year restoration started and the church reopened at 2017.

Notes

References

Quarters of Fatih
Golden Horn
Byzantine church buildings in Istanbul